The Jammu and Kashmir football team is an Indian football team representing Jammu and Kashmir in Indian state football competitions including the Santosh Trophy.

The team took part in the 72ndnd Santosh Trophy held in Uttar Pradesh during January 2018. Akif Javed Reshi from Anantnag was the captain of the team.

Jammu and Kashmir has hosted the Santosh Trophy twice, in 1979 and 2007.

Honours 
 Mir Iqbal Hussain Trophy
 Winners (1): 1987–88

References 

Santosh Trophy teams
Football in Jammu and Kashmir
Football clubs in Jammu and Kashmir
Organizations with year of establishment missing